Missirikoro is a village and rural commune in the Cercle of Sikasso in the Sikasso Region of southern Mali. The commune covers an area of 132 square kilometers and includes 9 small villages. In the 2009 census it had a population of 2007. The village of Missirikoro, the administrative center (chef-lieu) of the commune, is 12 km southwest of Sikasso.

References

Communes of Sikasso Region